Whitby is a railway station serving the town of Whitby in North Yorkshire, England. It is the southern terminus of the Esk Valley Line from Middlesbrough. The station is owned by Network Rail and services operated by Northern Trains for mainline services and the North Yorkshire Moors Railway for heritage services.

History 

Whitby's original railway station stood near to the end of the current platform, in the form of the offices, workshop and carriage shed of the Whitby and Pickering Railway; a single track horse worked line opened throughout in 1836. Its engineer was George Stephenson.

In 1845, the W&P was taken over by the York and North Midland Railway and converted into a double tracked, steam worked line. The Y&NM built the present Whitby station to the design of its architect George Townsend Andrews, who also designed the locomotive shed and the goods shed. Andrews' station included a fine 'Euston Truss' overall roof which was removed by British Railways in 1953 and replaced by the present awnings.

Block signalling replaced the time interval system in 1876 and brought Whitby an unusual three storey signal box to make it high enough to see over the adjacent goods shed.

In 1900, the NER authorised the installation of Tile Maps at 25 of their stations. Whitby is one of nine stations left to have their map still in situ and intact.

The NER became part of the London and North Eastern Railway at the grouping of the railways in 1923 and the LNER became part of British Railways with the nationalisation of the railways in 1948. The only changes brought to Whitby were in locomotives, rolling stock and signalling; the basic structure remained unchanged.

The station was scheduled to be closed in the 1963 Beeching Report, which recommended the removal of all three lines serving the station. The route to York via Pickering and Malton was closed as scheduled, while the coast lines had gone by 1965. However the Esk Valley Line to Middlesbrough was kept open because of poor road access for replacement buses.

With the closure of all but the Esk Valley Line, Whitby lost almost all of its staff. A run-round loop for excursion trains was retained and was used by the regular NYMR services from 2007 until 2014.

Platforms 3 and 4 were entirely removed and the site sold off, to be occupied by a supermarket. Platform 2 was cut back to what remains of the trainshed and its track removed, leaving only platform 1 rail served.  Apart from the roofless and truncated station, Whitby's only other surviving railway buildings are the two track engine shed, originally built by the York and North Midland Railway and extended by the NER and the neglected remains of one of the pair of Whitby and Pickering Railway 1835 weighbridge houses.

In 2013, plans were approved for major development work around the station. This included the rebuilding and restoration of platform 2, to  a somewhat longer length than the original. When the rebuilding of platform 2 was complete in 2014, the NYMR increased their service to four trains per day (five in peak periods) to and from Whitby. In December 2019, Northern increased their services from four trains per day to six.

Services

Northern Trains

As of the May 2021 timetable change, the station is served by six trains per day (four on Sunday) towards Middlesbrough via Nunthorpe. Most trains continue to Newcastle via Hartlepool. All services are operated by Northern Trains.

Rolling stock used: Class 156 Super Sprinter and Class 158 Express Sprinter

North Yorkshire Moors Railway
The North Yorkshire Moors Railway operates heritage services between Pickering and Whitby via Grosmont. Services run daily from Easter until the end of October each year, with some additional services at other times of year.

Historic structures

References

Further reading

External links 
 
 

Whitby
Railway stations in the Borough of Scarborough
DfT Category F1 stations
Railway stations in Great Britain opened in 1847
Northern franchise railway stations
North Yorkshire Moors Railway
1847 establishments in England
Former York and North Midland Railway stations
George Townsend Andrews railway stations
Grade II listed buildings in North Yorkshire